Sherman Carl "Katsy" Keifer (September 3, 1891 – February 19, 1927) was a pitcher in Major League Baseball. He played for the Indianapolis Hoosiers in 1914, having made his professional debut in 1913 with the Class D Traverse City Resorters of the Michigan State League.

References

External links

1891 births
1927 deaths
Major League Baseball pitchers
Indianapolis Hoosiers players
Baseball players from Pennsylvania
Traverse City Resorters players
Battle Creek Crickets players
St. Joseph Drummers players
St. Marys Saints players
Worcester Busters players
Worcester Boosters players
Augusta Tygers players
People from California, Pennsylvania